Buhl City Hall is the seat of municipal government for Buhl, Minnesota, United States.  It was built in 1913 during the city's rapid expansion as a mining community on the Iron Range.  It was listed as Buhl Village Hall on the National Register of Historic Places in 1983 for its local significance in the themes of architecture and politics/government.  It was nominated for being a well preserved early-20th-century Beaux-Arts municipal hall and Buhl's long-serving government center.

See also
 List of city and town halls in the United States
 National Register of Historic Places listings in St. Louis County, Minnesota

References

1913 establishments in Minnesota
Beaux-Arts architecture in Minnesota
Buildings and structures in St. Louis County, Minnesota
City and town halls in Minnesota
City and town halls on the National Register of Historic Places in Minnesota
Government buildings completed in 1913
National Register of Historic Places in St. Louis County, Minnesota